The European qualifying competition for the 2020 FIFA Futsal World Cup was a men's futsal competition that determined the six UEFA teams joining the automatically qualified hosts Lithuania in the 2021 FIFA Futsal World Cup (originally 2020 but postponed due to COVID-19 pandemic).

Apart from Lithuania, a record 48 of the remaining 54 UEFA nations entered the competition, including World Cup qualifying debutants Germany, Kosovo, Scotland, and Northern Ireland who entered their first international men's futsal competition.

Format
The qualifying competition consists of four rounds:
Preliminary round: The lowest-ranked 32 teams play in the preliminary round, and are drawn into eight groups of four teams. The winners and runners-up of each group advance to the main round to join the 16 highest-ranked teams which receive byes to the main round.
Main round: The 32 teams are drawn into eight groups of four. The winners and runners-up of each group advance to the elite round.
Elite round: The 16 teams are drawn into four groups of four. The winners of each group qualify directly for the World Cup, while the runners-up advance to the play-offs.
Play-offs: The four teams are drawn into two ties to play home-and-away two-legged matches to determine the last two European qualified teams.

In the preliminary round, main round and elite round, each group is played as a round-robin mini-tournament at the pre-selected hosts.

Tiebreakers
In the preliminary round, main round and elite round, teams are ranked according to points (3 points for a win, 1 point for a draw, 0 points for a loss), and if tied on points, the following tiebreaking criteria are applied, in the order given, to determine the rankings (Regulations Articles 13.01 and 13.02):
Points in head-to-head matches among tied teams;
Goal difference in head-to-head matches among tied teams;
Goals scored in head-to-head matches among tied teams;
If more than two teams are tied, and after applying all head-to-head criteria above, a subset of teams are still tied, all head-to-head criteria above are reapplied exclusively to this subset of teams;
Goal difference in all group matches;
Goals scored in all group matches;
Penalty shoot-out if only two teams have the same number of points, and they met in the last round of the group and are tied after applying all criteria above (not used if more than two teams have the same number of points, or if their rankings are not relevant for qualification for the next stage);
Disciplinary points (red card = 3 points, yellow card = 1 point, expulsion for two yellow cards in one match = 3 points);
UEFA coefficient;
Drawing of lots.

In the play-offs, the team that scores more goals on aggregate over the two legs qualifies for the final tournament. If the aggregate score is level, the away goals rule is applied, i.e., the team that scores more goals away from home over the two legs advances. If away goals are also equal, extra time is played. The away goals rule is again applied after extra time, i.e., if there are goals scored during extra time and the aggregate score is still level, the visiting team advances by virtue of more away goals scored. If no goals are scored during extra time, the tie is decided by penalty shoot-out (Regulations Article 16.01).

Teams
The 48 teams were seeded according to the coefficient ranking, calculated based on the following:
UEFA Futsal Euro 2016 final tournament and qualifying competition
2016 FIFA Futsal World Cup final tournament and qualifying competition
UEFA Futsal Euro 2018 final tournament and qualifying competition

The coefficient ranking was also used for seeding in the preliminary round and main round draws, where each team was assigned a seeding position according to their ranking for the respective draw. Eight teams were pre-selected as hosts for the preliminary round and eight teams were pre-selected as hosts for the main round.

The draws for the preliminary round and main round was held on 12 December 2018, 14:00 CET (UTC+1), at the UEFA headquarters in Nyon, Switzerland. The mechanism of the draws for each round was as follows:
In the preliminary round, the 32 teams were drawn into eight groups of four containing one team from each of the seeding positions 1–4. First, the eight teams which were pre-selected as hosts were drawn from their own designated pot and allocated to their respective group as per their seeding positions. Next, the remaining 24 teams were drawn from their respective pot which were allocated according to their seeding positions. Based on the decisions taken by the UEFA Emergency Panel, Kosovo and Bosnia and Herzegovina could not be drawn in the same group.
In the main round, the 32 teams were drawn into eight groups of four, containing one team from each of the seeding positions 1–4. First, the eight teams which were pre-selected as hosts were drawn from their own designated pot and allocated to their respective group as per their seeding positions. Next, the remaining 24 teams were drawn from their respective pot which were allocated according to their seeding positions (including the eight preliminary round winners and eight preliminary round runners-up, whose identity was not known at the time of the draw, which were allocated to seeding positions 3 and 4 respectively). Winners and runners-up from the same preliminary round group could not be drawn in the same group. Based on the decisions taken by the UEFA Emergency Panel, should Armenia, Gibraltar, or Kosovo advance from the preliminary round and qualify for a main round group with Azerbaijan (Armenia), Spain (Gibraltar), or Bosnia and Herzegovina or Serbia (Kosovo), they would be swapped with the preliminary round group winner or runner-up in the same seeding position (3 or 4) of the next possible main round group. Should Kosovo, Bosnia and Herzegovina and Serbia all end up in the same group, the preliminary round group runner-up would be moved first to the next possible main round group, followed, if necessary, by the preliminary round group winner to avoid the clashes.

Notes
Teams marked in bold have qualified for the World Cup.
 – No rank (men's team did not enter in the competitions used for computing coefficients)
(H):  Teams pre-selected as hosts for the preliminary round and the main round

Schedule
The qualifying matches are played on dates that fall within the FIFA Futsal International Match Calendar.

In the preliminary round, main round and elite round, the schedule of each group is as follows, with one rest day between matchdays 2 and 3 for four-team groups, and no rest days for three-team groups (Regulations Articles 18.04, 18.05 and 18.06):

Note: For scheduling, the hosts are considered as Team 1, while the visiting teams are considered as Team 2, Team 3, and Team 4 according to their seeding positions.

Preliminary round
The winners and runners-up of each group advanced to the main round to join the 16 teams which receive byes. The preliminary round was scheduled to be played between 29 January and 3 February 2019.

Times are CET (UTC+1), as listed by UEFA (local times, if different, are in parentheses).

Group A

Group B

Group C

Group D

Group E

Group F

Group G

Group H

Main round
The winners and runners-up of each group advanced to the elite round. The main round was scheduled to be played between 22 and 27 October 2019.

Times up to 26 October 2019 are CEST (UTC+2), thereafter times are CET (UTC+1), as listed by UEFA (local times, if different, are in parentheses).

Group 1

Group 2
Note: Ukraine were originally to host.

Group 3

Group 4

Group 5

Group 6

Group 7

Group 8

Elite round
The draws for the elite round and play-offs were held on 7 November 2019, 14:15 CET (UTC+1), at the UEFA headquarters in Nyon, Switzerland. For the elite round, the 16 teams were drawn into four groups of four, containing one best-four ranked main round group winner according to the coefficient ranking (seeding position 1), one other main round group winner (seeding position 2), and two main round group runners-up (seeding positions 3 or 4). First, a draw was held to select the four hosts from the seven potential hosts, which were allocated to their respective group as per their seeding positions. Next, the remaining 12 teams (including potential hosts not selected) were drawn from their respective pot which were allocated according to their seeding positions (group runners-up, including hosts, were allocated to first seeding position 4, then seeding position 3). Teams from the same main round group could be drawn in the same group. Based on the decisions taken by the UEFA Emergency Panel, Russia and Ukraine could not be drawn in the same group.

Legend
(Rank): Coefficient ranking for seeding
(H): Elite round hosts selected by draw
(h): Potential elite round hosts not selected by draw

For the play-offs, the four elite round group runners-up, whose identity was not known at the time of the draw, were drawn into two ties without any seeding. As Russia and Ukraine could not play against each other, if such a tie occur in the play-offs after the completion of the elite round, the second teams drawn in the two ties (who play the first leg away) would be swapped.

The winners of each group qualified for the 2021 FIFA Futsal World Cup, while the runners-up of each group advanced to the play-offs. The elite round was scheduled to be played between 27 January and 5 February 2020.

Times are CET (UTC+1), as listed by UEFA (local times, if different, are in parentheses).

Group A

Group B

Group C

Group D

Play-offs
The winners of each tie qualify for the 2021 FIFA Futsal World Cup. The play-offs were originally scheduled to be played on 9 and 12 April 2020, but had been postponed due to the COVID-19 pandemic, initially to a later date tentatively between June and mid-August. On 17 June 2020, UEFA announced that the matches had been rescheduled to be played between 2 and 11 November 2020.

|}

Times are CET (UTC+1), as listed by UEFA (local times, if different, are in parentheses).

4–4 on aggregate. The Czech Republic won 6–5 on penalties and qualified for the 2021 FIFA Futsal World Cup.

Serbia won 6–5 on aggregate.

Qualified teams for FIFA Futsal World Cup
The following seven teams from UEFA qualified for the 2021 FIFA Futsal World Cup, including Lithuania which qualified as hosts.

1 Bold indicates champions for that year. Italic indicates hosts for that year.

Top goalscorers
Preliminary round: 
Main round: 
Elite round: 
Play-offs:

Notes

References

External links

Futsal World Cup Matches: 2020 Qualifying, UEFA.com

2020
Uefa
qualification
qualification
qualification
January 2019 sports events in Europe
February 2019 sports events in Europe
October 2019 sports events in Europe
January 2020 sports events in Europe
February 2020 sports events in Europe
November 2020 sports events in Europe
December 2020 sports events in Europe
Sports events postponed due to the COVID-19 pandemic